Santo Domingo is a barrio in the municipality of Peñuelas, Puerto Rico. Its population in 2010 was 5,761.

Geography
The barrio is located near the source of the 2019-20 Puerto Rico earthquakes and suffered from flooding that took place after Hurricane Isaias in 2020.

History
Puerto Rico was ceded by Spain in the aftermath of the Spanish–American War under the terms of the Treaty of Paris of 1898 and became an unincorporated territory of the United States. In 1899, the United States Department of War conducted a census of Puerto Rico finding that the population of Santo Domingo barrio was 812.

Santo Domingo community
Santo Domingo is one of several communities located in Santo Domingo barrio.

See also

 List of communities in Puerto Rico

References

Barrios of Peñuelas, Puerto Rico